Gil Mantera's Party Dream was an American electronic synthpop party band hailing originally from Youngstown, Ohio, United States, with Gil Mantera living in Columbus, Ohio as well as Pittsburgh, Pennsylvania.

Biography 
Gil Mantera's Party Dream spawned from a three-man act called "Party Talk" that played a one night show in August 1998 in Youngstown, Ohio at Cedars Lounge. The act consisted of Richard Elmsworth (Ultimate Donny), Glen Whiteweather (Gil Mantera), and Brian Gage (Tartron). Ultimate Donny described the band as, "A joke band called Party Talk, playing retro '80s-style dance music and pretty much making jackasses of ourselves."

The group disbanded after Brian moved to California. With Gil and Donny, Party Talk regrouped a few months later to play a CD release show at the club, despite the fact they had no CD in the works. With the departure of their third member, Party Talk evolved into Gil Mantera's Party Dream, and the duo gained a reputation for their anything-goes live shows.

Discography 
 Best Friends – 2000, self-released CDEP, out of print
 Once Triangular – 2004, self-released CDLP, out of print
 Bloodsongs – 2005, Audio Eagle CDLP
 Ballerina EP – 2008, digital self-release
 Dreamscape – 2009, digital self-release and CDLP; Psychic Dog Records
 Bloodbrothers – TBA, TBA CDLP

References

External links
Official website
Myspace account
Fat Possum Records site

Electronic music groups from Ohio
Fat Possum Records artists
Musical groups established in 1999